The 1995 Arizona State Sun Devils football team represented Arizona State University during the 1995 NCAA Division I-A college football season. The team's head coach was Bruce Snyder, who was coaching his fourth season with the Sun Devils and 16th season overall. Home games were played at Sun Devil Stadium in Tempe, Arizona. They participated as members of the Pacific-10 Conference.

Schedule

Roster

References

Arizona State
Arizona State Sun Devils football seasons
Arizona State Sun Devils football